Taranidaphne dufresnei is a species of sea snail, a marine gastropod mollusk in the family Raphitomidae.

Description
The length of the shell attains 8 mm, fusiform-biconic to broadly-biconic in shape, teleoconch with a small to intermediate number of rapidly expanding whorls, apex acute, last whorl large and inflated.

Distribution
This marine species occurs off Yemen and in the Red Sea.

References

External links
 
 Gastropods.com: Taranidaphne dufresnei

dufresnei
Gastropods described in 2001